Gol Dasteh or Goldasteh may refer to:

Goldasteh, Hamadan
Gol Dasteh, Kerman
Gol Dasteh, Tehran